Frederick John Mills (April 28, 1865 – September 28, 1953) was a Republican politician and prominent engineer from the U.S. State of Idaho. He served as the fourth lieutenant governor of Idaho. Mills was elected in 1895 along with Governor William J. McConnell. Mills also served as State Engineer of Idaho from 1895 until 1897.

On October 8, 1899, Mills shot and killed J.C. O'Melveny in O'Melveny's office in Salt Lake City, Utah. An hour before the shooting, Mrs. Mills had confessed to her husband an affair with O'Melveny. Mills was acquitted at his January 1900 trial.

References

External links

Idaho Republicans
Lieutenant Governors of Idaho
1865 births
1953 deaths